Edmundo Israel Sosa (born March 6, 1996) is a Panamanian professional baseball shortstop for the Philadelphia Phillies of Major League Baseball (MLB). Sosa signed with the St. Louis Cardinals as an international free agent in 2012. He made his MLB debut with the Cardinals in 2018.

Career

St. Louis Cardinals

Sosa signed with the St. Louis Cardinals as an international free agent in July 2012. He made his professional debut in 2013 with the Dominican Summer League Cardinals and spent the whole season there, batting .314 with three home runs and 27 RBIs in 47 games.  He played for both the Gulf Coast Cardinals and State College Spikes in 2014, batting a combined .274 with one home run and 23 RBIs in 55 total games between both teams, and he played with the Johnson City Cardinals in 2015, slashing .300/.369/.485 with seven home runs and 16 RBIs in 49 games. In 2016, Sosa played for the Panama national baseball team in the 2017 World Baseball Classic qualifiers. Sosa spent 2016 with both the Peoria Chiefs, with whom he was named a Midwest League All-Star, and the Palm Beach Cardinals, and he finished 2016 batting a combined .270 with three home runs and 34 RBIs in 97 total games between both teams. The Cardinals added him to their 40-man roster after the season. Sosa's 2017 season was limited due to injury; he played in only 58 games, posting a .288 batting average with one home run and 16 RBIs. After the season, the Cardinals assigned Sosa to the Surprise Saguaros of the Arizona Fall League (AFL). Sosa appeared in 17 total games in the AFL, batting .305 with seven RBIs, along with a .715 OPS. He began 2018 with the Springfield Cardinals before being promoted to the Memphis Redbirds. In 123 games between the two clubs, he hit .270 with 12 home runs and 59 RBIs.

Sosa was promoted to the major leagues on September 23, 2018, and he made his debut that night. In 2019, he began the year with Memphis and was recalled by St. Louis for the first time on July 16. On August 4, 2020, it was announced that Sosa had tested positive for COVID-19, and he was subsequently placed on the injured list.

In 2021, Sosa made the Opening Day roster. He received limited playing time until he took over at shortstop after Paul DeJong was placed on the injured list in mid-May. On June 4, 2021, Sosa hit his first career home run, a solo home run off of Cincinnati Reds starter Luis Castillo. For the 2021 season, Sosa made 288 at-bats over 113 games, slashing .271/.346/.389 with six home runs and 27 RBIs.

Philadelphia Phillies

On July 30, 2022, the Cardinals traded Sosa to the Philadelphia Phillies for JoJo Romero. 

In the 2022 regular season, with the two teams combined he batted .227/.275/.369 in 176 at bats, with two home runs and six steals in seven attempts. He played 42 games at shortstop, and 22 games at third base.

In the ninth inning of game one of the 2022 National League Wild Card Series, between the Phillies and Cardinals, Sosa scored a crucial insurance run in the top of the ninth inning. The Phillies went on to win the game by a score of 6-3. In game two, with his team up 2-0, Sosa caught a flyball off the bat of Tommy Edman in foul territory to record the final out of the game and secure the series win for the Phillies.

On January 13, 2023, Sosa agreed to a one-year, $950K contract with the Phillies, avoiding salary arbitration.

References

External links

1996 births
Living people
Sportspeople from Panama City
Panamanian expatriate baseball players in the United States
Major League Baseball players from Panama
Major League Baseball infielders
St. Louis Cardinals players
Philadelphia Phillies players
Dominican Summer League Cardinals players
Gulf Coast Cardinals players
State College Spikes players
Johnson City Cardinals players
Peoria Chiefs players
Palm Beach Cardinals players
Springfield Cardinals players
Surprise Saguaros players
Memphis Redbirds players
Águilas Cibaeñas players
Panamanian expatriate baseball players in the Dominican Republic